Henry Charles McQueen  (6 July 1898 – 30 March 1976) was a New Zealand teacher, university lecturer, vocational research officer and commissioner of apprenticeship. He was born in Beaconsfield, Tasmania, Australia, on 6 July 1898. In 1927 he completed a thesis in on the effects of movie-watching on children.

In the 1973 New Year Honours, McQueen was appointed an Officer of the Order of the British Empire, for services to the community.

References

1898 births
1976 deaths
New Zealand educators
New Zealand academics
Australian emigrants to New Zealand
New Zealand Officers of the Order of the British Empire
People from Tasmania